Finále Plzeň is a film festival based in the Czech Republic. It focuses on Czech feature and documentary films. The best film is awarded the Golden Kingfisher by a jury. It was founded in 1967 and the first year was held in 1968. The festival was held in 1970 but the Golden Kingfisher wasn't awarded. The festival wasn't held again until 1990, when 12 films were awarded the Kingfisher to represent Czech and Slovak cinematography from the 1969-1990 period.

Awards

Festival jury
Awarded Films:

Student jury

References

External links
Festival website

 
Recurring events established in 1968
Film festivals established in 1968
1968 establishments in Czechoslovakia
Tourist attractions in Plzeň